Luthang, is a Filipino traditional toy gun made from a hollow cylindrical piece of bamboo and a piston. A seed or a wet piece of paper (the "bullet") is inserted in one end of the cylinder and the piston is pushed in rapidly at the other end. This results in the air compressing inside before it pushes the "bullet" out with a pop. The toy is popular among children in rural areas of the Philippines.

The name luthang is originally Cebuano, meaning a small naval cannon (lantaka). The word has been recorded in Spanish dictionaries of Visayan languages since at least 1711, where its meaning evolved to include muskets, arquebuses and shotguns. The word is still used as a verb meaning "to gun down" in Cebuano languages; and in Hiligaynon as an archaic synonym of pistola (gun or pistol).

See also
Sumpit
Lantaka
Fire piston
Sipa
Pop gun

References

Naval artillery
Philippine games
Traditional games
Children's games
Toy weapons